Zosuchus ("Zos [Canyon] crocodile") is a genus of basal, Late Cretaceous crocodyliform from the Mongolia.

The type species is Z. davidsoni, after preparator Amy Davidson. The name was emended to davidsonae in 2004.

Discovery
It was found in the Redbeds of Zos Canyon (Djadokhta Formation) in the Gobi Desert of Mongolia by expeditions organized by the American Museum of Natural History, and described by palaeontologists Diego Pol and Mark Norell in 2004.
 
Material of Z. davidsonae consists of five specimens:

 IGM 100/1305 (holotype): isolated skull and lower jaws
 IGM 100/1304
 IGM 100/1306
 IGM 100/1307
 IGM 100/1308

Morphology

This genus had a very short snout.

Systematics
Pol & Norell (2004) found Zosuchus davidsoni to be sister to Sichuanosuchus and Shantungosuchus, the three forming a basal clade of crocodyliforms based on the presence of a ventrally deflected posterior region of the mandibular rami. A 2018 cladistic analysis found Zosuchus, along with Sichuanosuchus, Shantungosuchus, and Shartegosuchidae, to form a basal mesoeucrocodyliform clade, Shartegosuchoidea.

Sources 

 Pol, D. & Norell, M. A., (2004). "A new crocodyliform from Zos Canyon, Mongolia". American Museum Novitates 3445: 1-36.

Late Cretaceous crocodylomorphs of Asia
Terrestrial crocodylomorphs
Fossils of Mongolia
Prehistoric pseudosuchian genera